{{Infobox television
| image                =
| caption              = 
| alt_name             = 
| genre                = Variety show
| creator              = 
| writer               = 
| director             = 
| creative_director    = 
| developer            = 
| presenter            = 
| starring             = Ken ShimuraCha Kato
| voices               = 
| narrated             = 
| theme_music_composer = Tsugutoshi Kato
| opentheme            = 
| endtheme             = 
| composer             = Akihiko Takashima
| country              = Japan
| language             = Japanese
| num_seasons          = 
| num_episodes         = 
| list_episodes        = 
| executive_producer   = 
| producer             = Toshiaki Takahashi
| editor               = 
| location             = 
| cinematography       = 
| camera               = 
| runtime              = 
| channel              = TBS
| picture_format       = 
| audio_format         = 
| first_aired          = 
| last_aired           = 
| related              =  
}}
 was a Japanese television variety show aired on Tokyo Broadcasting System around the mid-1980s. Starring Ken Shimura and Cha Kato, former members of the group The Drifters from Hachiji Dayo! Zen'in Shugo, the irreverent and satirical program would poke fun at contemporary society in Japan, and would feature comedy vignettes similar to those found on The Benny Hill Show or The Carol Burnett Show. Leslie Nielsen once made a special appearance on the show as well.

The duo also had a PC Engine video game, Kato-chan and Ken-chan, based on their antics, filled with toilet humor, and featuring them as the game's playable characters. It was translated and censored for a Western TurboGrafx-16 release as J.J. & Jeff due to copyright issues and the toilet humor.

 Home videos segment 
As the home camcorder became more popular in Japan, the show included a segment featuring viewer-submitted funny home videos (home movies), on which Ken and Kato would comment. In 1989, American producer Vin Di Bona initiated a partnership with Tokyo Broadcasting System to develop a similar program in the west, which ultimately led to the successful America's Funniest Home Videos (which is still on the air as of 2023) and other similar shows worldwide. Some videos seen in the first season of America's Funniest Home Videos originally aired on Fun TV with Kato-chan and Ken-chan, and the latter remains credited within all episodes of AFHV as the original inspiration for the former. ABC, which owns half of America's Funniest Home Videos, pays a royalty fee to the Tokyo Broadcasting System for the use of the format (even though Kato-chan and Ken-chan left the air in 1992). The British show You've Been Framed!'' (1990-2022) was similarly based on the same format.

References

External links
 "Tokyo Broadcasting Co. information about show"

Japanese variety television shows
1986 Japanese television series debuts
1992 Japanese television series endings
TBS Television (Japan) original programming